Alternative Commercial Crossover is the 11th album by West London Post punk and Indie band The Times released in 1993.<ref name="Discogs.com">[http://www.discogs.com/Times-Alternative-Commercial-Crossover/master/95525 The Times on Discogs.com]</ref>

Track listing
Side AThe Obligatory Grunge Song - 04:38Finnegans Break - 05:51How Honest Are Pearl Jam? - 03:48Baby Girl - 06:02Ballad Of Georgie Best - 04:14Lundi Bleu (Praise The Lord Mix) - 05:57
Side BA Palace In The Sun - 04:49Sorry, I've Written A Melody - 07:24Finnegans Break (Corporate Rock Mix) - 06:02The Whole World's Turning Scarface - 05:01All I Want Is You To Care'' - 06:03

Personnel
Edward Ball (vocals, guitars, keyboards)
Paul Heeren (lead and slide guitar, vocals)
Paul Mulreany (drums, percussion, vocals, guitar)
Jan Stevens (vocals)

References

The Times (band) albums
1993 albums